Richard E. Galway (born January 21, 1944) is a former Associate Justice of the New Hampshire Supreme Court. He was sworn in on February 13, 2004. He retired as of February 1, 2009.

Galway attended Bishop Bradley High School in Manchester, New Hampshire. After graduating magna cum laude with a Bachelor of Arts degree in political science from the University of New Hampshire in 1966, Galway spent a year in England at the University of Leeds as a Fulbright Scholar, continuing his studies in political science. He then attended Boston University Law School, earning his J.D. in 1970. He was admitted to the New Hampshire Bar Association that year.

Prior to becoming a New Hampshire Supreme Court justice, Richard Galway was a trial lawyer at the Manchester law firm Devine Millimet for 25 years. He is considered a leading expert in workers' compensation law and has written two books and many articles on the subject. He became a New Hampshire Superior Court Associate Justice on February 3, 1995, and continued in that role until he was sworn into the NH Supreme Court.

References 

Justices of the New Hampshire Supreme Court
1944 births
University of New Hampshire alumni
Boston University School of Law alumni
Fulbright alumni